Marco Kasper (born 8 April 2004) is an Austrian professional ice hockey centre for Rögle BK of the Swedish Hockey League (SHL) as a prospect for the Detroit Red Wings of the National Hockey League (NHL). He was drafted eighth overall by the Red Wings in the 2022 NHL Entry Draft.

Playing career
Kasper made his professional debut for Rögle BK on 21 January 2021, where he played 11 minutes 35 seconds. He became the second player born in 2004 to play in the SHL.

He was drafted eighth overall by the Detroit Red Wings in the 2022 NHL Entry Draft. On 13 July 2022, the Red Wings signed Kasper to a three-year, entry-level contract.

International play
Kasper represented Austria at the 2021 World Junior Ice Hockey Championships where he recorded one assist in four games. He will again represent Austria at the 2022 World Junior Ice Hockey Championships.

Personal life 
Kasper's father, Peter, played for various professional hockey clubs in Austria, as well as at the 2002 Winter Olympics. Kasper had a role in the Austrian film Harrinator, playing a young hockey player named Robert Begusch.

Career statistics

Regular season and playoffs

International

References

External links
 

2004 births
Living people
Austrian ice hockey centres
Detroit Red Wings draft picks
National Hockey League first-round draft picks
Sportspeople from Innsbruck
Rögle BK players
Austrian expatriate ice hockey people
Austrian expatriate sportspeople in Sweden
Expatriate ice hockey players in Sweden